The United States Virgin Islands competed at the 11th Pan American Games held in Havana, Cuba from August 2 to August 18, 1991.

Medals

Bronze

 Men's 4x100 metres: Keith Smith, Mitch Peters, Kevin Robinson, Neville Hodge, and Derry Pemberton

See also
 Virgin Islands at the 1992 Summer Olympics

Nations at the 1991 Pan American Games
P
1991